Evlogi Peak is a peak rising to 2090 m in Imeon Range on Smith Island, South Shetland Islands.  Situated 1 km north-northeast of the summit Mount Foster, and 1.3 km southwest of Antim Peak, with intervening saddles of elevation 1950 and 1800 m (Vakarel Saddle) respectively.  Overlooking Chuprene Glacier to the northwest, Pashuk Glacier to the east and Rupite Glacier to the southeast.  Bulgarian mapping in 2008.  Named after the Bulgarian financier, industrialist and philanthropist Evlogi Georgiev (1819–1897) whose endowment funded the construction of Sofia University’s main building.

Maps
Chart of South Shetland including Coronation Island, &c. from the exploration of the sloop Dove in the years 1821 and 1822 by George Powell Commander of the same. Scale ca. 1:200000. London: Laurie, 1822.
  L.L. Ivanov. Antarctica: Livingston Island and Greenwich, Robert, Snow and Smith Islands. Scale 1:120000 topographic map. Troyan: Manfred Wörner Foundation, 2010.  (First edition 2009. )
 South Shetland Islands: Smith and Low Islands. Scale 1:150000 topographic map No. 13677. British Antarctic Survey, 2009.
 Antarctic Digital Database (ADD). Scale 1:250000 topographic map of Antarctica. Scientific Committee on Antarctic Research (SCAR). Since 1993, regularly upgraded and updated.
 L.L. Ivanov. Antarctica: Livingston Island and Smith Island. Scale 1:100000 topographic map. Manfred Wörner Foundation, 2017.

References
 Evlogi Peak. SCAR Composite Antarctic Gazetteer.
 Bulgarian Antarctic Gazetteer. Antarctic Place-names Commission. (details in Bulgarian, basic data in English)

External links
 Evlogi Peak. Copernix satellite image

Mountains of Smith Island (South Shetland Islands)
Bulgaria and the Antarctic